Zavershye is a rural locality (a selo) in Beryozovskoye Rural Settlement, Ostrogozhsky District, Voronezh Oblast, Russia. The population was 123 as of 2010. There are 3 streets.

Geography 
Zavershye is located 30 km northwest of Ostrogozhsk (the district's administrative centre) by road. Beryozovo is the nearest rural locality.

References 

Rural localities in Ostrogozhsky District